Youth on Parole is a 1937 American drama film directed by Phil Rosen and starring Marian Marsh and Gordon Oliver.

Plot summary 
"Bobbie" Blake (Marian Marsh) and Phillip Henderson (Gordon Oliver) are complete strangers looking in a jewelry store window, when a hood known as "The Sparkler" (Miles Mander) sets them up to take the rap, stashing some of the loot in their pockets as the gang makes their getaway.

No one believes that they are innocent, not even their public defender. When they serve their time in "The Joint", no one will give them a break with their prison record, not even their own families; and they cannot keep a job.

Their landlady, Mrs. Abernathy (Margaret Dumont), likes them and encourages them to get married.

Despite the danger, Phil convinces Bobbi that their only chance is to see "The Sparkler" and even the score.

Cast 
 Marian Marsh as 'Bobbie' Blake
 Gordon Oliver as Phillip Henderson
 Margaret Dumont as Mrs. Abernathy (landlady)
 Peggy Shannon as Peggy
 Miles Mander as Sparkler (gang leader)
 Sarah Padden as Mrs. Blair
 Wade Boteler as Mr. Blair
 Mary Kornman as Mae Blair
 Joe Caits as Fingy (robber)
 Milburn Stone as Ratty (robber)
 Harry Tyler as Danny Hinkle (cellmate)
 Ranny Weeks as Michael Martin
 Theodore von Eltz as The Public Defender
 Ula Love as Maizie
 Paul Stanton as Police inspector
 Fred Toones as Redcap (uncredited)

External links 
 
 

1937 drama films
1937 films
American drama films
American black-and-white films
1930s English-language films
Republic Pictures films
Films directed by Phil Rosen
1930s American films